Lara Joy Dickenmann (born 27 November 1985) is a Swiss footballer. She played for German club VfL Wolfsburg and with French club Olympique Lyonnais. She is a versatile footballer who can play as a midfielder or a full-back on either side of the field. She formerly played on the college level at the Ohio State University breaking many records and earning several player honors. In 2008, Dickenmann departed the university and joined D1 Féminine club Lyon.

Dickenmann is also a member of the Switzerland women's national football team. She starred for the national team at youth level and made her senior debut in August 2002 at the age of 16 against France, scoring in a 2–1 defeat.

Career

Youth career
Dickenmann was born in the town of Kriens located in the Canton of Lucerne. She began her career with the boy's section of local outfit SC Kriens spending seven years at the club. In 2000, she joined DFC Sursee. Dickenmann gained notice for her performance with her national team's youth sides helping the Swiss U-19 team reach the 2002 and 2004 UEFA Women's Under-19 Championship and winning three league championships and two league cups with Sursee. For her efforts during the 2003–04 season, Dickenmann was named the Swiss Player of the Year.

Collegiate career
In 2004, Dickenmann decided to move to the United States of America to play college soccer at the Ohio State University. In her freshman season, she was named the Big Ten Freshman of the Year, as well as the nation's Freshman of the Year by numerous publications. She was also deemed a second-team All-American by the NSCAA. Dickenmann established single-season records for OSU in goals scored (13) and assisted on (12) helping Ohio State reach the Elite 8 in the NCAA national tournament.

In her sophomore season, due to earning call ups to the Swiss national team, Dickenmann missed significant playing time. However, she still earned all-Big Ten honors after being selected to the second team. Her junior season was more spectacular as she was named Ohio State's Most Valuable Player and was also selected as a first-team All-American by the NSCAA. On 14 December 2008, Dickenmann graduated from the university after completing a bachelor's degree in international business. She departed the university the career leader in assists (32), second in total points (89), and seventh in goals scored (27). Dickenmann was also a three-time Big Ten Academic All-American and a four-time Ohio State Scholar Athlete. She was the first Ohio State women's soccer player to earn an appearance on the Hermann Trophy watch list. The trophy is awarded to the top soccer player in the country.

Professional career
During the offseasons when Dickenmann was in college, in an effort to continue playing high level soccer and still maintain her college eligibility, she starred with the New Jersey Wildcats in 2006 and in 2007, played for Jersey Sky Blue. With Jersey Sky Blue, Dickenmann was named the W-League Most Valuable Player for the 2007 W-League season. Following her senior season at Ohio State, she played half a season with FC Zürich Frauen, the women's section of popular Swiss club FC Zürich helping the team win the 2008–09 league championship. Prior to graduating, it was announced that Dickenmann would be joining Division 1 Féminine club Olympique Lyonnais in 2009. Dickenmann joined the club mid-season during the 2008–09 season and was limited to only four appearances, though she did score two goals. Lyon were later declared champions of the league winning by a very wide margin. For the 2009–10 season, Dickenmann was named a starter and began the season on a positive note scoring a goal in Lyon's 6–0 win over Montigny-le-Bretonneux. On 29 November 2009, she scored her first professional hat trick in a 9–0 victory over ESOF Vendée La Roche-sur-Yon.

In April 2015 Dickenmann agreed a transfer to VfL Wolfsburg.

International career
Dickenmann starred with the Swiss women's under-19 team in both the 2002 and 2004 UEFA Women's Under-19 Championship. In both editions, the Swiss failed to get out of the group stage. On 14 August 2002, at the age 16, she made her international debut in a match against France. Switzerland lost the match 2–1, but Dickenmann was responsible for the Swiss's only goal scoring it in the 33rd minute. Since her debut, Dickenmann has been a regular in the squad appearing in teams that attempted to qualify for UEFA Women's Euro 2005, the 2007 FIFA Women's World Cup, and UEFA Women's Euro 2009; all of which the Swiss have failed to qualify for. Dickenman and Switzerland also missed out on qualification for the 2011 FIFA Women's World Cup. She scored her first goal of the qualification process in a 2–0 victory over the Republic of Ireland converting a penalty.

Career statistics

Club

Statistics accurate as of match played 13 September 2015

International

(Correct as of 18 May 2012)

Honours

Club

Zürich Frauen
Nationalliga A: Winner 2008–09

Lyon
Division 1 Féminine: Winner 2009–10, 2010–11, 2011–12, 2012–13, 2013–14, 2014–15
Coupe de France Féminine: Winner 2011–12, 2012–13, 2013–14, 2014–15
UEFA Women's Champions League: Winner 2010–11, 2011–12

VfL Wolfsburg
Bundesliga: Winner 2016–17, 2017–18, 2018–19, 2019–20
DFB-Pokal: Winner 2015–16, 2016–17, 2017–18, 2018–19, 2019–20, 2020–21

Personal

She is openly lesbian and  married with her former teammate Anna Blässe.

References

External links
 
 Reference website
 Lyon player profile 

1985 births
Living people
Sportspeople from Lucerne
Swiss women's footballers
Swiss expatriate sportspeople in France
Swiss expatriate sportspeople in the United States
Swiss expatriate sportspeople in Germany
Ohio State Buckeyes women's soccer players
Expatriate women's soccer players in the United States
Expatriate women's footballers in Germany
Olympique Lyonnais Féminin players
VfL Wolfsburg (women) players
Expatriate women's footballers in France
USL W-League (1995–2015) players
Switzerland women's international footballers
2015 FIFA Women's World Cup players
Women's association football midfielders
Women's association football defenders
FIFA Century Club
New Jersey Wildcats players
Swiss Women's Super League players
FC Zürich Frauen players
Division 1 Féminine players
Frauen-Bundesliga players
UEFA Women's Euro 2017 players
Swiss expatriate women's footballers